Mangal Prasad Gupta is a Nepalese politician, belonging to the CPN (UML) currently serving as the member of the 2nd Federal Parliament of Nepal. In the 2022 Nepalese general election, he won the election from Kapilvastu 3 (constituency).

References

Living people
Nepal MPs 2022–present
1945 births